The Battle of Waterloo was a decisive European battle of 1815.

Battle of Waterloo may also refer to:
"Battle of Waterloo" (song), a song for piano written by G. Anderson in the 1860s 
The Battle of Waterloo (film), a 1913 feature film
The Battle of Waterloo (painting), an 1815 oil painting by William Sadler II 
The Battle of Waterloo: The British Squares Receiving the Charge of the French Cuirassiers, an 1874 painting by Philippoteaux
Waterloo (1970 film) or The Battle of Waterloo, a Soviet-Italian film

See also

Waterloo (disambiguation)
Battle of Waterloo reenactment, held annually at the historical battlefield
:Category:Works about the Battle of Waterloo